Jane Eyre is a 1921 American silent drama film directed by Hugo Ballin and starring Norman Trevor, Mabel Ballin and Crauford Kent. It is based on the novel of the same title by Charlotte Brontë.

Cast
 Norman Trevor as Mr. Rochester
 Mabel Ballin as Jane Eyre
 Crauford Kent as St. John Rivers
 Emily Fitzroy as Grace Poole, a servant
 John Webb Dillion as Mason, Mrs. Rochester's brother
 Louis R. Grisel as John Eyre, Jane's uncle
 Stephen Carr as John Reed
 Venie Atherton as Miss Fairfax
 Elizabeth Arians as Mrs. Rochester 
 Harlan Knight as Mr. Breckelhurst
 Helen Miles as Burns
 Julia Hurley as Rivers' Maid
 Sadie Mullen as Miss Ingram
 June Ellen Terry as Adele, Mr. Rochester's ward
 Florence Flagler as Miss Mason
 Bertha Kent as Mr. Rochester's Maid
 Marie Schaefer as Mrs. Reed

References

Bibliography
 Munden, Kenneth White. The American Film Institute Catalog of Motion Pictures Produced in the United States, Part 1. University of California Press, 1997.

External links
 

1921 films
1921 drama films
1920s English-language films
American silent feature films
Silent American drama films
American black-and-white films
Films directed by Hugo Ballin
Films distributed by W. W. Hodkinson Corporation
1920s American films